Andover Priory was an alien priory of Benedictine monks in Andover, Hampshire, England.

Foundation
The gift was renewed by William Rufus in 1100, he also directed that all churches built under the mother church of Andover should either be utterly destroyed or held by the monks of St. Florent. The abbey establishing the priory with a colony of monks soon after the church was given to them. The homes of the monks are described as being juxta ecclesiam (beside the church).

An Alien Priory
As an alien priory (i.e., the dependency of a French mother-house) Andover would have had a certain inbuilt instability of status before the English crown, especially  whenever there were hostilities between France and England, and particularly  during the Hundred Years' War. Its fate would have shared the fluctuating fortunes of every  alien priory.

At the dissolution of alien priories in 1414 the priory was granted to Winchester College. The college was obliged to pay yearly pensions of forty-five marks to the Crown, twenty marks to Joanna of Navarre, the widow of Henry IV and fifty-two marks to the ex-prior, Nicholas Gwyn.

A piece of ivy-covered wall next to the present parish church is believed to be the only surviving remnant of the priory.

References
A History of the County of Hampshire: Volume 2, The Victoria County History 1973

Benedictine monasteries in England
Alien priories in England
Priories in Hampshire
11th-century establishments in England
1414 disestablishments in England
Christian monasteries established in the 11th century
William the Conqueror
William II of England